Aubrey Jones (20 November 1911 – 10 April 2003) was a British Conservative politician who served as Member of Parliament for Birmingham Hall Green from 1950 to 1965.

Early life
Jones was born in Penydarren. He attended Cyfarthfa Castle Secondary School in Merthyr Tydfil and later graduated with a first-class degree from the London School of Economics, where he won the Gladstone Memorial Prize. During his time at university he joined the Liberal Party, only to leave "after having heard a speech by Sir Archibald Sinclair." Soon after graduation he found employment as a "secretary-cum-research assistant" to the Foreign Secretary, Sir John Simon. He was to undertake further work as a research assistant at the League of Nations in Geneva before moving on to journalism. An initial stint as a reporter for the Western Mail led, in 1937, to his recruitment by The Times, where he worked firstly as a sub-editor and then, two years later, as a correspondent in Berlin. Following the outbreak of the Second World War he was recruited into the Intelligence Corps and soon transferred to Section V of the Secret Intelligence Service. He was posted to Bari after the Allied invasion of Italy.

Career
At the 1950 general election, he was elected as the first Member of Parliament (MP) for the new constituency of Birmingham Hall Green. He was Minister of Fuel and Power from 1955 to 1957, and the last Minister of Supply from 1957 to 1959. He resigned from the House of Commons in 1965 in order to take up the position of Chairman of the newly created Prices & Incomes Board. He received an Honorary degree (Doctor of Science) from the University of Bath in 1966.

After leaving the Prices and Incomes Board in October 1970, he became chair of Laporte Industries and a director of Thomas Tilling, Cornhill Insurance and Black & Decker.

At the 1983 general election, he stood as the Liberal candidate for Sutton Coldfield, having rejoined the party in 1980 after a hiatus of nearly fifty years.

Published works 

 The Pendulum of Politics, 1946
 If Steel is Nationalised, 1949
 Industrial Order, 1950
 The New Inflation: the politics of prices and incomes, 1973
 Economics and Equality (editor), 1976
 My LSE (contribution), 1977
 The End of the Keynesian Era (contribution), 1977
 Oil: the missed opportunity, 1981
 Britain’s Economy: the roots of stagnation, 1985

References

Sources

External links 
 
The Papers of Aubrey Jones held at Churchill Archives Centre

1911 births
2003 deaths
Alumni of the London School of Economics
Conservative Party (UK) MPs for English constituencies
Members of the Privy Council of the United Kingdom
Ministers in the Eden government, 1955–1957
Ministers in the Macmillan and Douglas-Home governments, 1957–1964
Ministers of Supply
Secret Intelligence Service personnel
UK MPs 1950–1951
UK MPs 1951–1955
UK MPs 1955–1959
UK MPs 1959–1964
UK MPs 1964–1966